William de Blois was a medieval Bishop of Worcester.

Life

William was a canon of the diocese of Lincoln and held the office of Archdeacon of Buckingham in that diocese by 10 May 1206. Presumably he was related to William de Blois, Bishop of Lincoln, but the exact relationship is unknown.

William was elected to the see of Worcester sometime around 25 August 1218 and his election was confirmed by the papal legate to England Guala. He was consecrated on 7 October 1218. He died on 17 or 18 August 1236 or on 17 August.

In 1224 William was appointed Sheriff of Staffordshire and Shropshire.

While Bishop of Worcester, William imposed particularly strict rules on Jews within the diocese in 1219. As elsewhere in England, Jews were officially compelled to wear square white badges, supposedly representing tabula. Blois attempted to impose additional restrictions on usury, and wrote to Pope Gregory in 1229 to ask for further, harsher measures, and complaining about lack of enforcement of measures in Canterbury. In response, the papacy demanded that Christians be prevented from working in Jewish homes, and for enforcement of the wearing of badges.

Citations

References
 British History Online Archdeacons of Buckingham accessed on 3 November 2007
 British History Online Bishops of Worcester accessed on 3 November 2007
 
 

1236 deaths
Bishops of Worcester
Archdeacons of Buckingham
13th-century English Roman Catholic bishops
High Sheriffs of Staffordshire
High Sheriffs of Shropshire
Year of birth unknown